The Stolpersteine in Mikulov, Slavkov u Brna and Znojmo lists the Stolpersteine in three towns of the South Moravian Region. Stolpersteine is the German name for stumbling blocks collocated all over Europe by German artist Gunter Demnig. They remember the fate of the Nazi victims being murdered, deported, exiled or driven to suicide.

Generally, the stumbling blocks are posed in front of the building where the victims had their last self chosen residence. The name of the Stolpersteine in Czech is: Kameny zmizelých, stones of the disappeared.

The lists are sortable; the basic order follows the alphabet according to the last name of the victim.

Mikulov

Slavkov u Brna

Znojmo 
Before the attack of the Nazi regime in 1938, there lived about 700 Jews in Znojmo, about 2.5 percent of the population. The small Jewish community had grown from 357 persons in 1869 to 749 in 1921. The Jews were well integrated, they had their own synagogue and a small cemetery built in 1868 north of the town on the Kühberg. In the so-called Reichspogromnacht on 9 November 1938, the synagogue was burnt down by the German National Socialists. In 1940 the remaining remains of the synagogue were demolished.

In the case of the Weinberger family, two stumbling blocks were laid for each victim, one in Czech and one in German.

Dates of collocations 

The Stolpersteine in the three towns were collocated by the artist himself on the following dates:
 30 October 2012: Mikulov
 15. September 2014: Slavkov u Brna
 4. August 2016: Znojmo

The Czech Stolperstein project was initiated in 2008 by the Česká unie židovské mládeže (Czech Union of Jewish Youth) and was realized with the patronage of the Mayor of Prague.

See also 
 List of cities by country that have stolpersteine
 Stolpersteine in the Czech Republic

External links

 stolpersteine.eu, Demnig's website
 holocaust.cz Czech databank of Holocaust victims
 Yad Vashem, Central Database of Shoah Victims' Names

References

Mikulov, Slavkov u Brna and Znojmo
Monuments and memorials
Monuments and memorials